Nassarius capensis, common name the Cape dogwhelk, is a species of sea snail, a marine gastropod mollusk in the family Nassariidae, the Nassa mud snails or dog whelks.

Description
The length of the shell varies between 10 mm and 20 mm.

Distribution
This marine species occurs off the southern coast of South Africa, and in the Indian Ocean off Zanzibar and Réunion.

References

 Cernohorsky W. O. (1984). Systematics of the family Nassariidae (Mollusca: Gastropoda). Bulletin of the Auckland Institute and Museum 14: 1–356.
 Branch, G.M. et al. (2002). Two Oceans. 5th impression. David Philip, Cate Town & Johannesburg
 Marais J.P. & Kilburn R.N. (2010) Nassariidae. pp. 138–173, in: Marais A.P. & Seccombe A.D. (eds), Identification guide to the seashells of South Africa. Volume 1. Groenkloof: Centre for Molluscan Studies. 376 pp.

External links
 

Nassariidae
Gastropods described in 1846